Jiří Gach (born 4 August 1969) is a Czech sports shooter. He competed at the 1996 Summer Olympics and the 2000 Summer Olympics.

References

1969 births
Living people
Czech male sport shooters
Olympic shooters of the Czech Republic
Shooters at the 1996 Summer Olympics
Shooters at the 2000 Summer Olympics
Sportspeople from Zlín